Amanda Lawrence (born May 6, 1997) is an American powerlifter, who won 3 gold medals at the IPF World Classic Powerlifting Championships in the 84 kg category. During the championship, she has set three world records (squat, deadlift and total). In 2019, Lawrence was tied with second placed Daniella Melo, but won due to lower body weight (83.05 vs 83.55kg).

References

1997 births
Living people
American powerlifters
Female powerlifters